Kotomine can refer to:

Kirei Kotomine, a character from Fate/stay night
Risei Kotomine, a character from Fate/zero

See also
 Kotomin House, a historical building in Saint Petersburg, Russia
 Kōnomine Castle, a castle in Yamaguchi, Japan
 Kōnomine-ji, a Shingon Buddhist Temple in Yasuda, Kōchi, Japan